David Berkowitz (born 1953), also known as the Son of Sam, is an American serial killer.

David Berkowitz may also refer to:

David Berkowitz (contract bridge) (born 1949), American professional bridge player
David Berkowitz, columnist for Baytown Sun